Dušan Malovec (born 1 July 1957) is a Slovak sprinter. He competed in the men's 4 × 400 metres relay at the 1980 Summer Olympics.

References

External links
 

1957 births
Living people
Athletes (track and field) at the 1980 Summer Olympics
Slovak male sprinters
Olympic athletes of Czechoslovakia
Place of birth missing (living people)